The 1604-VLZ Pro is a compact analog mixer manufactured by professional audio equipment brand Mackie. It features sixteen input channels, four output sub-groups, and a user-replaceable fuse. Each of the input channels features a high-quality microphone preamplifier.

VLZ stands for Very Low Impedance.

References

 LOUD Technologies Inc. (n.d.a). Mackie 1604-VLZ Pro. Retrieved December 21, 2003 from http://www.mackie.com/products/1604vlzpro/
 LOUD Technologies Inc. (n.d.b). Mackie Mixers. Retrieved December 21, 2003 from http://www.mackie.com/products/mixers/index.html

Mixing consoles
LOUD Audio